Propyl gallate, or propyl 3,4,5-trihydroxybenzoate is an ester formed by the condensation of gallic acid and propanol.  Since 1948, this antioxidant has been added to foods containing oils and fats to prevent oxidation.  As a food additive, it is used under the E number E310.

Description
Propyl gallate is an antioxidant. It protects against oxidation by hydrogen peroxide and oxygen free radicals.

Uses
Propyl gallate is used to protect oils and fats in products from oxidation; it is used in foods, cosmetics, hair products, adhesives, and lubricants.

It is used as a triplet state quencher and an antioxidant in fluorescence microscopy.

Biological effects

A 1993 study in fat rodents found little or no effect on carcinogenesis by propyl gallate.

A 2009 study found that propyl gallate acts as an estrogen antagonist.

References

Antioxidants
Carboxylate esters
Food antioxidants
Pyrogallols
E-number additives